Avernish is a small, scenic, rural community located in the Highlands of  Scotland. Nearby attractions include The Eilean Donan Castle and The Isle of Skye. The road to and through this community is single track only; livestock as well as domesticated animals are sometimes present on the road.

Populated places in Lochalsh